Priskë e Madhe is a village in the former municipality of Dajt in Tirana County, Albania. At the 2015 local government reform it became part of the municipality Tirana.

References

Populated places in Tirana
Villages in Tirana County